Rhyacichthys is a genus of fish belonging to the family Rhyacichthyidae. They occur in the Indo-Pacific region.

Species
Rhyacichthys aspro (Valenciennes, 1837) - loach goby
Rhyacichthys guilberti Dingerkus & Séret, 1992

References

Rhyacichthyidae